Nawabganj is an upazila of Dhaka District in the Division of Dhaka, Bangladesh.

Geography
It has 47,411 households and a total area 244.81 km2.

Nawabganj is surrounded by Singair Upazila on the North, Dohar Upazila on the South, Keraniganj, Sirajdikhan and Sreenagar Upazilas on the East, Harirampur and Manikganj Sadar Upazilas on the West.

Demographics
As of the 1991 Bangladesh census, Nawabganj had a population of 269,189. Males constituted 49.31% of the population, and females 50.69%. 134,813 residents were over eighteen. Nawabganj had an average literacy rate of 34.5% (7+ years). For reference, the national average is 32.4%.

Politics
Nawabganj Upazila is currently under rule of the Bangladesh Awami LeagueFrom the 2008 elections, it merged with Dohar Upazila as Dhaka-1. BEXIMCO Group Chairman Md Salman Fazlur Rahman is the current Member of Parliament, representing Dhaka-1. 

Nawabganj Thana, now an Upazila, was established in 1974.

Political parties
Many political parties are currently active in Nawabganj. The most popular parties include Bangladesh Awami League, which runs as Nawabganj Upazila Awami League and the Bangladesh Nationalist Party, which runs as Nawabganj Upazila BNP and the Jatiyo Party, which runs as Nawabganj Upazila Jatiyo Party

Politicians 

 A big number of politicians come from Nawabganj. The notable are:
 Abdul Mannan Bhuiyan
 Moslem Uddin Khan
 Abdul Haleem Chowdhury 
 Borhanuddin Khan
 Khandaker Abu Ashfaq
 Salma Islam
 Abdul Baten Mia
 Muazzam Hossain
 Azizur Rahman Foku

Administration
Nawabganj Upazila is divided into 14 union parishads: Agla, Bakshanagar, Bandura, Barrah, Baruakhali, Churain, Galimpur, Jantrail, Joykrishnapur, Kailail, Kalakopa, Nayansree, Shekaripara, and Sholla. The Union parishads are subdivided into 190 mauzas and 342 villages.

See also
Upazilas of Bangladesh
Districts of Bangladesh
Divisions of Bangladesh

References

Upazilas of Dhaka District